Ma Guangtong (born 5 May 1995) is a Chinese cyclist, who currently rides for UCI Continental team .

Major results

2015
 Tour of Thailand
1st Points classification
1st Stage 2
 2nd Overall Tour of Yancheng Coastal Wetlands
1st Young rider classification
2016
 1st  Road race, National Road Championships
 1st Points classification Tour de Ijen
 1st  Mountains classification Tour of Hainan
2017
 2nd Overall Tour of Thailand
 5th Road race, Asian Under-23 Road Championships

References

External links

1995 births
Living people
Chinese male cyclists
20th-century Chinese people
21st-century Chinese people